Spirit FM may refer to:

Spirit FM (UK radio station), a radio station in West Sussex, United Kingdom
Spirit FM (Missouri), a network of Christian radio stations in Missouri, United States
Spirit FM, a network of Christian radio stations in Virginia and West Virginia, United States, which includes WPAR
Spirit FM, a network of Christian radio stations of the Catholic Media Network in the Philippines
WBVM, 90.5 FM, a Christian radio station in Tampa, Florida, United States branded Spirit FM